The 2010 season was Bangkok United's 7th season in the top division of Thai football. This article shows statistics of the club's players in the season, and also lists all matches that the club played in the season.

Team kit

Chronological list of events
10 November 2009: The Thai Premier League 2010 season first leg fixtures were announced.
1 January 2010: Worrakon Vijanarong announced as new head coach
17 October 2010: Bangkok United were relegated from the Thai Premier League after 7 seasons in the top flight.
24 October 2010: Bangkok United finished in 15th place in the Thai Premier League.

Squad

Transfers

In

Out

Matches

League

League table

FA Cup

Third round

Fourth round

League Cup

First round

1st Leg

2nd Leg

Second round

1st Leg

2nd Leg

Bangkok Charity Cup

References

2010
Bangkok United